Chester Harding (September 1, 1792 – April 1, 1866) was an American portrait painter known for his paintings of prominent figures in the United States and England.

Early life
Harding was born at Conway, Massachusetts, on September 1, 1792. He was the fourth of twelve children born to his mother, Olive (née Smith) Harding, and his father, Abiel Harding. He was brought up in the wilderness of New York State, he was a lad of robust physique, standing over 6'3". His family removed to Caledonia, New York, when he was fourteen years old, and he was early thrown upon his own resources for support. His initial trade was that of a woodturner.

Career

In the War of 1812, he marched as a drummer with the militia to the St Lawrence.  He became subsequently chair-maker, peddler, inn-keeper, and house-painter, painting signs in Pittsburgh, Pennsylvania. He worked at this latter occupation a year, when acquaintance with a traveling portrait painter led him to attempt that art.  Having succeeded in producing a crude portrait of his wife, he devoted himself enthusiastically to the profession.

He painted several other portraits at Pittsburgh, and then went to Paris, Kentucky, where he finished 100 portraits in six months at $25 each. He made enough money to take him to the schools at the Pennsylvania Academy of the Fine Arts in Philadelphia. He then established himself in St. Louis, and eventually went on the road as an itinerant portrait painter.  In August 1823, he went to England and set up a studio in London, and spent three years in studying and painting. He met with great success, painting royalty and the nobility, and, despite the lack of an early education and social experience, he became a favorite in all circles.

On his return to the United States in 1826, he settled in Boston, initially residing in Beacon Hill, Boston, Massachusetts, in what became known as the Chester Harding House, a National Historic Landmark which now houses the Boston Bar Association. He stayed there until 1830.  In 1845, after the death of his wife, he went to England again for a second nine-month visit.  After his return, he resided in Springfield, Massachusetts, spending his winters frequently in St. Louis or in some of the southern cities.  In 1828, he was elected into the National Academy of Design as an Honorary Academician.

He wrote My Egotistography, which was privately printed.

Portraits
He painted portraits of many of the prominent men and women of his time. Among the people who sat for him were James Madison, James Monroe, John Quincy Adams, John Marshall, Nicholas Brown, Jr., Dudley Leavitt Pickman, Charles Carroll, William Wirt, Henry Clay, John C. Calhoun, Washington Allston, Stephen Van Rensselaer, Samuel Rogers, Sir Archibald Allison, and the Dukes of Norfolk, Hamilton, and Sussex.  Harding is the only known painter who painted Daniel Boone from life.  His last work was a portrait of Gen. William T. Sherman.  His portrait of Daniel Webster went to the Bar Association of New York, and that of John Randolph to the Corcoran Gallery at Washington, D.C.

Personal life

On February 14, 1815, Harding was married to Caroline Matilda Woodruff (1795–1845) near Caledonia in Livingston County, New York. Caroline was the daughter of James Woodruff.  Together, they were the parents of nine children, including four sons, two each who fought on opposing sides in the Civil War:

 Mary Ophelia Harding (1818–1892), who married John Marshall Krum (1810–1888), the 11th Mayor of St. Louis, in 1839.
 Margaret Eliot Harding (1823–1908), who married Rev. William Orne White (1821–1911) in 1863.
 Chester Harding Jr. (1827–1875), a Union Army Brevet Brigadier General.
 Horace Harding (1828–1899), a civil engineer.
 James Harding (1830–1902), a General in the Missouri State Guard and Major in the Confederate States Army. He married Christina Amelia Cordell (1834–1899) in 1855.

His wife died on August 27, 1845 in Springfield, Massachusetts.  Harding died in Boston on April 1, 1866, and is buried in Springfield Cemetery in Springfield.

Descendants
Through his son Horace, he was the paternal grandfather of William P. G. Harding (1864–1930), the Chairman of the Federal Reserve and President of the Federal Reserve Bank of Boston, and Chester Harding (1866–1936), the Governor of the Panama Canal Zone from 1917 to 1921 who, late in life, also became a noted portrait painter.

Portrait gallery

See also

 Harding's Gallery (Boston)

References

External links

 
 WorldCat
 Worcester Art Museum. Biography of Harding.
 “Chester Harding,” The Atlantic Monthly, Vol. XIX, January, 1867, No, CXI, pp. 485–488 at cdl.library.cornell.edu.  Visited 20 December 2010.

1792 births
1866 deaths
American portrait painters
Artists from Boston
19th-century American painters
American male painters
19th century in Boston
Davy Crockett
People from Conway, Massachusetts
Painters from Massachusetts
Painters from New York (state)
People from Beacon Hill, Boston